Turkey competed at the 1960 Summer Olympics in Rome, Italy.

Medalists

References 

Nations at the 1960 Summer Olympics
1960
1960 in Turkish sport